The following is a Forbes list of Mexican billionaires is based on an annual assessment of wealth and assets compiled and published by Forbes magazine on April 17, 2017, updated January 8, 2021.

Mexican Rich List 2021
 Carlos Slim - US$62.8 billion - Telmex, Inbursa, América Móvil, Grupo Carso and Telcel
 Germán Larrea Mota-Velasco - US$25.9 billion - Grupo México
 Ricardo Salinas Pliego - US$12.9 billion - Grupo Salinas
 Alejandro Baillères - US$9.2 billion - Peñoles and Palacio de Hierro
 Juan Francisco Beckmann - US$7 billion - Jose Cuervo
 María Asunción Aramburuzabala - US$5.8 billion - Grupo Modelo
 Antonio del Valle - US$3.1 billion - Mexichem
 Carlos Hank Rhon - US$2.2 billion - Banorte
 Roberto Hernández Ramirez US$1.9 billion - Banamex
 Rufino Vigil González - US$ 1.7 billion - Industrias CH
 Fernando Chico Pardo - US$1.4 billion - Grupo Financiero del Sureste
 Alfredo Harp Helú - US$1.2 billion - Banamex
 David Peñaloza Alanis - US$1 billion - Grupo Tribasa

References 

Mexico

Net worth
billionaires by net worth